Percival Stewart Blencowe (27 January 1887 – 10 January 1951) was an Australian rules footballer who played with South Melbourne in the Victorian Football League (VFL).

Family
The son of John Robert Blencowe (1852-1921), and Louisa Blencowe (1853-1918), née Galagher, Percival Stewart Blencowe was born at Fitzroy, Victoria on 27 January 1887.

Death
He died (suddenly) on 10 January 1951.

Notes

References

External links 
 
 "Ernie Blencowe's" statistics, from AFL Tables 
 

1887 births
1951 deaths
Australian rules footballers from Victoria (Australia)
Sydney Swans players